The Spartiate was originally a French 74-gun ship of the line, launched in 1797. In 1798, she took part in the Battle of the Nile, where she became one of the nine ships captured by the Royal Navy.

In 1805, HMS Spartiate fought at the Battle of Trafalgar under Francis Laforey. With , she forced the surrender of the Spanish ship , of 80 guns. Casualties were three killed (two seamen & one boy), and twenty wounded (the boatswain [Clarke], two Midshipmen [Bellairs & Knapman], one Marine [William Parsons] and sixteen sailors), according to the three logs (Captain's log, Ship's log, Master's log).

Spartiate returned to her home port of Plymouth for repairs from December 1805 to February 1806. Thereafter she joined the Channel Fleet and, for the next two years, was involved in the blockade of Rochefort. In January 1808, she was in Admiral Strachan's squadron, and pursued Contre-Admiral Zacharie Allemand's flight from Rochefort. On 21 February 1808 she joined the Mediterranean Fleet at Palermo, and was deployed here until the end of 1809. In June 1809, she participated in the attack on the islands of Ischia and Procida.

On board during the Trafalgar action was First-Lieutenant James Clephan, who was presented with the ship's Union Jack by the crew after the battle as a mark of their esteem. The flag, recently found in a drawer of one of the descendants of James Clephan, is regarded as one of very few surviving Union Flags from the Battle of Trafalgar, and probably the best preserved. With battle scars still visible, it was sold for £384,000 when it went for auction in London on Trafalgar Day, 21 October 2009.

In the 1820s and 30s Spartiate was assigned to the Royal Navy's South America Station. 
In 1824 Spartiate suffered damages in the fulfillment of these duties and the Navy sent shipwrights from England to repair her.

In 1832 Spartiate, under the command of Captain Robert Tait (Royal Navy officer), became the flagship of Rear Admiral Sir Michael Seymour, 1st Baronet, the newly appointed commander of the South America Station.

In July 1834 Sir Michael died while underway to the station but Spartiate and Tait continued to serve his successor, Vice Admiral Sir Graham Eden Hamond, 2nd Baronet until 1835 (when Hamond shifted his Flag to HMS Dublin (1812).

Spartiate was converted to a sheer hulk in August 1842. She was later broken up, a process completed on 30 May 1857.

Notes

Citations

References

Lavery, Brian (2003) The Ship of the Line - Volume 1: The development of the battlefleet 1650-1850. Conway Maritime Press. .
Winfield, Rif (2005) British warships in the age of sail, 1793-1817 : design, construction, careers & fates 
Lyon, David J (2003) The sailing navy list: all the ships of the Royal Navy built, purchased and captured 1688-1860

External links
 
 

Ships of the line of the Royal Navy
Ships of the line of the French Navy
Téméraire-class ships of the line
1797 ships